Events from 1974 in England

Incumbent

Events
 1 January–7 March – The Three-Day Week is introduced by the Conservative Government as a measure to conserve electricity during the period of industrial action by coal miners.

February 
 4 February – Eleven people are killed in the M62 coach bombing; on 8 February the toll reaches 12 with the death in hospital of an 18-year-old soldier seriously injured in the bombing.
 7 February
 12 February – BBC1 first airs the children's television series Bagpuss, made by Peter Firmin and Oliver Postgate's Smallfilms in stop motion animation.
 14 February
 Bob Latchford, the Birmingham City centre forward, becomes Britain's most expensive footballer in a £350,000 move to Everton.

March 
 3 March – 180 Britons are among the dead when Turkish Airlines Flight 981 travelling from Paris to London crashes in a wood near Paris, killing all 346 aboard.
 10 March – Ten miners die in a methane gas explosion at Golborne Colliery near Wigan, Lancashire.

April
The current system of metropolitan and non-metropolitan counties came into effect on 1 April 1974 and replaced the administrative counties and county boroughs, which were abolished at that time.

May

June

July

August

September

October

November

December

Births
 17 April – Victoria Beckham, singer and designer
 5 September – Lauren Jeska, transgender fell runner convicted of the attempted murder of Ralph Knibbs
 20 October – Mohammad Sidique Khan, Islamic terrorist, leader of 7 July 2005 London bombings (died 2005)

Deaths

See also
1974 in Northern Ireland
1974 in Scotland
1974 in Wales

References

 
England
Years of the 20th century in England
1970s in England